The 1961 season was Santos Futebol Clube's forty-ninth in existence and the club's first consecutive season in the top flight of Brazilian football.

Background
After finishing the 1959 Campeonato Paulista as runners-up, Santos failed to qualify for the 1960 Taça Brasil. The club would win the state league in 1960, which granted his qualification to the 1961's national championship.

Players

Squad

Statistics

Appearances and goals

Source: Match reports in Competitive matches

Goalscorers

Competitions

Friendlies

Matches 

American tour

European tour

Taça Brasil

Results summary

Semifinals

Matches

Finals

Matches

Campeonato Paulista

Matches

Torneio Rio-São Paulo

First stage

Matches

Final stage

Matches

References

External links
1961 season at Acervo Santos FC 

1961
Santos F.C.